The Laxmi Nagar  metro station is located on the Blue Line of the Delhi Metro and it was set open for public use on 6 January 2010.

Earlier there was no parking facility near the station but now there is an authorized parking available nearby the station. It is one of the busiest stations of metro network as Laxmi Nagar itself is a home for numerous workers and students.

Public amenities include a Sulabh complex while two others are being set up at road level on either sides.
There is a Buddy's and a Hot'n' Chill outlet at the station that sells fast food, snacks and cold drinks. There are also two ATMs, one of Punjab National Bank(Located near ticket counter at concourse level) and other of HDFC bank (located at exit of concourse level)  Counter no. 5 of the station was used additionally for sale of smart cards, it's also the main customer care of the station. But as the rush got heavier, one more counter for sale of smart card was set up at the exit gate (Opposite counter no. 5).

The nearby locality of station has many coaching centre and book shops and is a hub for job aspirants. Moreover, there are a number of restaurants and few hotels nearby. Numerous retailers of electronic appliances and mobile phones are located within the radius of 1 km of the station.

Station layout

Facilities

 ATM

Connections
A nearby metro feeder bus stand is there to provide connectivity to passengers to red line of Delhi metro and New Ashok Nagar(New Ashok Nagar is at border of Noida region of Uttar Pradesh). The feeder bus begins the journey from Shastri Park metro station and terminates at New Ashok Nagar. Laxmi Nagar lies in middle of this route

See also

References

External links

 Delhi Metro Rail Corporation Ltd. (Official site) 
 Delhi Metro Annual Reports
 
  Laxmi Nagar Information
 UrbanRail.Net – descriptions of all metro systems in the world, each with a schematic map showing all stations.

Delhi Metro stations
Railway stations opened in 2010
Railway stations in East Delhi district